Fifty-Shilling Boxer is a 1937 British comedy film directed by Maclean Rogers and starring Bruce Seton, Nancy O'Neil and Moore Marriott. Its plot concerns a young circus boxer who attempts to make a career for himself in the world of professional boxing.

Cast
 Bruce Seton - Jack Foster 
 Nancy O'Neil - Moira Regan 
 Moore Marriott - Tim Regan 
 Eve Gray - Miriam Steele 
 Charles Oliver - Jim Pollett 
 Aubrey Mallalieu - Charles Day

References

External links

1937 films
British sports comedy films
British boxing films
Films directed by Maclean Rogers
British black-and-white films
1930s sports comedy films
1937 comedy films
1930s English-language films
1930s British films